Torunik is a village in the Sisian Municipality of the Syunik Province in Armenia.

Demographics 
The Statistical Committee of Armenia reported its population was 138 in 2010, down from 181 at the 2001 census.

References 

Populated places in Syunik Province